Jili Subdistrict is an urban subdistrict in Liuyang City, Hunan Province, People's Republic of China. Taipingqiao Town merged to Jili Subdistrict on November 18, 2015. It borders Jiaoxi Township in the north, Guankou Subdistrict in the northeast, Huaichuan Subdistrict in the southeast, Gejia Township in the west, Dongyang Town in the northwest, and Hehua Subdistrict and Chengchong Town in the south.

History
In 2015, Taipingqiao Town merged to Jili Subdistrict.

Administrative division
The subdistrict is divided into seven villages and five communities, the following areas: 
 Shenxian'ao Community
 Jiliqiao Community
 Baiyi Community
 Xihe Community
 Gongjiaqiao Community
 Taiping Community
 Jinmei Community
 Xihu Village
 Beicheng Village
 Daowu Village
 Hongyuan Village
 Tangjiayuan Village
 Xingzhen Village
 Hesheng Village

Geography
Mountains located adjacent to and visible from the townsite are: Mount Daowu and Mount Xianren.

Liuyang River, also known as the mother river, flows through the subdistrict.

Daowushan Reservoir is the largest reservoir and largest water body in the subdistrict.

Economy
The economy is supported primarily by commerce and tourism.

Education
 Jili Middle School

Transportation
The West Bus station is situated at the subdistrict.

National Highway
The subdistrict is connected to two national highways: G106 and G319.

Provincial Highway
The Provincial Highway S103 runs southwest–northeast through the subdistrict.

Expressway
The Changsha–Liuyang Expressway, from Changsha, running northwest to southeast through the subdistrict to Jiangxi.

Religion
Xinghua Chan Temple is a Buddhist temple in the town.

Attractions
Mount Daowu Scenic Spot is a tourist attraction in the town.

Xinwuling Park is a public park in the subdistrict.

References

Divisions of Liuyang
Liuyang